Palaiyakkarars, or Poligar, (as the British referred to them) in Tamil Nadu refers to the holder of a small kingdom as a feudatory to a greater sovereign. Under this system, palayam was given for valuable military services rendered by any individual. The word pālayam means domain, a military camp, or a small kingdom. This type of Palayakkarars system was in practice during the rule of Pratapa Rudhra of Warangal in the Kakatiya kingdom. The system was put in place in Tamilnadu by Viswanatha Nayaka, when he became the Nayak ruler of Madurai in 1529, with the support of his minister Ariyanathar. Traditionally there were supposed to be 72 Palayakkarars. The majority of those Palaiyakkarar, who during the late 17th- and 18th-centuries controlled much of the Telugu region as well as the Tamil area, had themselves come from the Yadhavar, Kallar, Maravar and Vatuka, pala ekari communities.

The Palaiyakkarar of Madurai Country were instrumental in establishing administrative reforms by building irrigation projects, forts and religious institutions. The Palaiyakkarar who worshipped the goddess Kali did not allow their territory to be annexed by Aurangzeb.

Their wars with the British East India Company after the demise of the Madurai Nayakas is often regarded as one of the earliest struggles for Indian independence. Many captured Palaiyakkarar commanders were either executed or banished to the Andaman Islands by the British. Puli Thevar, Veerapandya Kattabomman, the Marudu brothers, Maveeran Alagumuthu Kone, Chinna Alagumuthu kone, Maruthanayagam, Dheeran Chinnamalai, and Uyyalawada Narasimha Reddy were some notable Palaiyakkarar who rose up in revolt against the British rule in South India. Their wars against the British East India Company predates the Indian rebellion of 1857 in Northern India by many decades but is still largely given less importance by historians.

Role
The Polygar's role was to administer their Palaiyams (territories) from their fortified centres. Their chief functions were to collect taxes, maintain law and order, run the local judiciary, and maintain a battalion of troops for the king.

They served as regional military and civil administrators. In turn they were to retain  of the revenue collected as tax, and submit the remaining to the king's treasury. The Polygars also at times founded villages, built dams, constructed tanks and built temples. Also the rulers taxed regions according to the cultivable and fertility of the land. Often several new rainwater tanks were erected in the semi-arid tracts of western and southern Tamil Nadu.

Their armed status was also to protect the civilians from robbers and dacoits who were rampant in those regions and from invading armies which often resorted to pillaging the villages and countryside.

Polygar Wars

The Polygar Wars were a series of wars fought by a coalition of Palaiyakkarar's against the British between 1798 and 1805. The war between the British and Veerapandiya Kattabomman is often classified as the First Polygar war (1799), while the Second Polygar War 1800–1805 against the British was fought by a much bigger coalition over the whole of western Tamil Nadu headed by Dheeran Chinnamalai and Maruthu Pandiyar brother of the Sivaganga. A final polygar war in 1847 against the British was fought by Uyyalawada Narasimha Reddy at Kovelakuntla (Koilakuntla)

The Polygars often had artillery and stubbornly resisted the storming of their hill forts. The British columns were exposed throughout the operations to constant harassing attacks and had usually to cut their way through almost impenetrable jungles while being fired on from under cover on all sides. It took more than a year to suppress the rebellion completely.

After a long and expensive campaign the British East India Company finally defeated the rebelling Polygars, some of whom were executed while others were banished to the Andaman Islands. Of the Polygars who submitted to the British, some of them were granted Zamindari status, which had only tax collection rights and disarmed them completely.

References

Further reading
 Rao, Velcheru Narayana, and David Shulman, Sanjay Subrahmanyam. Symbols of substance : court and state in Nayaka period Tamil Nadu (Delhi ; Oxford : Oxford University Press, 1998) ; xix, 349 p., [16] p. of plates : ill., maps ; 22 cm. ; Oxford India paperbacks ; Includes bibliographical references and index ; .
 Rajaram, K. (Kumarasamy), 1940–. History of Thirumalai Nayak (Madurai : Ennes Publications, 1982) ; 128 p., [1] leaf of plates : ill., maps ; 23 cm. ; revision of the author's thesis (M. Phil.--Madurai-Kamaraj University, 1978) Includes index ; bibliography p. 119–125 ; on the achievements of Tirumala Nayaka, fl. 1623–1659, Madurai ruler.
 Balendu Sekaram, Kandavalli, 1909–. The Nayakas of Madura by Khandavalli Balendusekharam (Hyderabad : Andhra Pradesh Sahithya Akademi, 1975) ; 30 p. ; 22 cm. ; "World Telugu Conference publication." ; History of the Telugu speaking Nayaka kings of Pandyan Kingdom, Madurai, 16th–18th century.
 K. Rajayyan, A History of Freedom Struggle in India
 K. Rajayyan, South Indian Rebellion-The First War of Independence (1800–1801)
 M. P. Manivel, 2003 – Viduthalaipporil Virupachi Gopal Naickar (Tamil Language), New Century Book House, Chennai
 N. Rajendran, National Movement in Tamil Nadu, 1905–1914 – Agitational Politics and State Coercion, Madras Oxford University Press.
D. Sreenivasulu, "Palegars or factionists, they call the shots in Rayalaseema", The Hindu (online) 24 January 2005.

External links
The Hindu:Madurai 72 Bastion Fort today 
Precolonial India in Practice: Society, Region, and Identity in Medieval Andhra 

Medieval India

Madurai Nayak dynasty
Noble titles
Positions of authority
Tamil history
Titles in India
Polygar Wars